Cthugha is a music visualization computer program. It was written in the mid-1990s by Kevin "Zaph" Burfitt, originally for the PC, and was later ported to other platforms. It was freely distributed.

History
Cthugha was started by Australian coder Kevin "Zaph" Burfitt in September 1993 under DOS for the PC, but not released to the public until version 2.0 in March 1994. It wasn't until release 5.1p in October 1994  that popularity of the program took off; this coinciding with the relatively new availability of cheap sound-cards for PCs, such as the Soundblaster.

Cthugha was released for Linux ("Cthugha-L") in May 1995, and for the Macintosh ("MaCthugha") in January 1996  

Cthugha was used as the video wall background for the Australian children's TV game show Challenger, hosted by Zoe Sheridan during the late 90s.

Burfitt stopped work on Cthugha in January 2001, and there were various attempts by others to carry on the project, but by that time there were so many clones of the software that there was little enthusiasm. Cthugha may have been the forerunner – either in inspiration, or possibly even as source-code – of the numerous and varied "visualisation" plugins for mp3 players and media players on many computer architectures.

In 1998, it was ported to the Winamp music player.

Usage
Cthugha uses a sound card's CD, line or microphone input.

Reaction
The oscilloscope patterns of Cthugha have been described as "weird" and "hypnotic".

See also
Cthugha - The mythical demon the software was named after.

References

External links
The Official Cthugha page
Cthugha development page

1994 software
Freeware
Audio software
Music visualization software